Bjarni Herjólfsson ( 10th century) was a Norse-Icelandic explorer who is believed to be the first known European discoverer of the mainland of the Americas, which he sighted in 986.

Life

Bjarni was born to Herjólfr, son of Bárdi Herjólfsson, and Thorgerdr in Iceland. In adulthood, Bjarni became a merchant captain, based in Norway, but visiting his father every summer in Iceland.

Discovery of America

Bjarni is believed to have been the first European to see North America. The Grœnlendinga saga (Greenlanders Saga) tells that one year he sailed to Iceland to visit his parents as usual, only to find that his father had gone with Erik the Red to Greenland. So he took his crew and set off to find him. But in that summer of 986, Bjarni, who had no map or compass, was blown off course by a storm. He saw a piece of land that was not Greenland. It was covered with trees and mountains and although his crew begged him to, he refused to stop and look around. Since no one in his crew had been to Greenland before, they had to search for it. Although he managed to regain his course, he reported seeing low-lying hills covered with forests some distance farther to the west. The land looked hospitable, but Bjarni was eager to reach Greenland to see his parents and did not land and explore the new lands. Eventually arriving in Greenland, he decided to settle with his father in Herjolfsnes. He reported his findings in Greenland but no one showed much interest in them until Bjarni returned to Norway after his father's death.

Legacy
After his voyage, word spread of the lands to the west he had seen, creating great intrigue throughout the Nordic Empire. Bjarni was both celebrated for his discoveries and chided—famously by Earl Eric—for his lack of investigation.  Professor Tryggvi J. Oleson of the University of Manitoba stated "There are strong arguments for the view that the three lands seen by Bjarni were Newfoundland, Labrador, and Baffin Island."

Greenlanders took special interest in his discoveries, and, as they lacked timber, became allured by the wooded coastline Bjarni reported sighting. Soon afterwards, Leif Erikson (Old Norse: Leifr Eiríksson),  the son of Greenland leader Erik the Red, bought the ship that Bjarni had used for the voyage, hired a crew of 35 people, and set out to retrace Bjarni's journey. The result is thought to be the Viking settlement at L'Anse aux Meadows in Newfoundland. This is the first known attempt at settlement by Europeans on the Americas.

In fiction
The main character, also named Bjarni, in the Cultures video game series is based on Herjólfsson.

The main character, Barney Hendrickson, of The Technicolor Time Machine realizes that he is Bjarni, his name having undergone some alterations to become more typical Norse over the generations.

References

Related reading
Oleson,  Tryggvi J., The Norsemen in America  (Ottawa: Canadian Historical Association, 1963) (CHA Historical Booklet No. 14).
Oleson, Tryggvi J., Early Voyages and Northern Approaches 1000-1632, Volume 1 of the Canadian Centenary Series (Toronto:  McClelland & Stewart, 1963;  re-issue with additional material, 1968).

10th-century Norwegian people
Scandinavian explorers of North America
Explorers of Canada
Icelandic explorers
10th century in Iceland
Viking explorers
Baffin Island
Viking Age in Canada
10th-century explorers
10th-century Vikings
Norse colonization of North America